Weber Ridge is a bare rock ridge, 8 nautical miles (15 km) long, located at the north end of Anderson Hills in northern Patuxent Range, Pensacola Mountains. Mapped by United States Geological Survey (USGS) from surveys and U.S. Navy air photos, 1956–66. Named by Advisory Committee on Antarctic Names (US-ACAN) for Max K. Weber, USGS topographic engineer in the Pensacola Mountains, 1965–66.

Ridges of Queen Elizabeth Land